The 161st New York Infantry Regiment was an infantry regiment of the Union Army during the American Civil War.

Service 
The regiment was organized in Elmira, New York and was mustered in for a three-year enlistment on October 27, 1862; it was composed of  companies from Chemung, Steuben, Schuyler, Chenango and Broome Counties. During this time, a typhoid epidemic caused many deaths, with subsequent desertions both at Elmira and in New York City.

The regiment left the State December 4, 1862; it served in Grover's Division, Department of the Gulf, from December, 1862; in 2d Brigade, Augur's Division, from December 31, 1862; in the 3d Brigade, Augur's Division, 19th Corps, from January 21, 1863; in 3d Brigade, 1st Division, 19th Corps, from March, 1863; in the 1st Brigade, 1st Division, 19th Corps, from August 15, 1863; in the Engineer Brigade, Department of the Gulf, from June, 1864; with the 17th Corps from August 14, 1864; in the 3d Brigade, 2d Division, Reserve, 19th Corps, from August 17, 1864; at Columbus, Kentucky, from October 26, 1864; in the 3d Brigade, 2d Division, Reserve, 19th Corps, at Memphis, Tennessee, from November 20, 1864; in the 4th Brigade, Reserve, Military Division of West Mississippi, from December 4, 1864; in 3d Brigade, 1st Division, 13th Corps, from February, 1865; in the District of Florida in June, 1865.

The spring 1863 attack on Port Hudson and the battle at Donaldsonville caused many casualties; illness at New Iberia caused many deaths while the autumn attack on Sabine Pass resulted in many captured. New recruits arrived in the winter of 1863-4 in time for the Red River Campaign. At the Battle of Sabine Cross Roads, many were wounded and captured, while in the summer many deaths from chronic diarrhea occurred at Morganza. New recruits again arrived in the fall, while the beginning of 1865 saw a steamboat accident with drownings and injuries. In the spring, the regiment participated in the Mobile Campaign, then traveled to Florida.

They were in the Department of Florida from July, 1865, and assigned to Fort Jefferson, Florida in Aug. 1865; the regiment was honorably discharged and mustered out November 12, 1865, at Tallahassee, Florida.

Total strength and casualties 
During its service the regiment lost by death, killed in action, 1 officer, 32 enlisted men; of wounds received in action, 23 enlisted men; of disease and other causes, 250 enlisted men; total, 1 officer, 305 enlisted men; aggregate, 306; of whom 13 enlisted men died in the hands of the enemy.

Commanders 
Colonel Gabriel T. Harrower
Colonel Henry G. Harrower
Lieutenant Colonel Marvin D. Stillwell
Lieutenant Colonel William B. Kinsey
Major Charles Straun
Major Willis E. Craig

See also 

List of New York Civil War regiments

Notes

References 
The Civil War Archive

External links 
New York State Military Museum Unit History Project New York State Military Museum and Veterans Research Center - Civil War - 161st Infantry Regiment History, photographs, table of battles and casualties, and historical sketch for the 161st New York Infantry Regiment.
Civil War Talk John H. Dickey questions Discussion in 'Civil War History - The Naval War' started by Mike Serpa, Dec 5, 2013.

Infantry 161
1862 establishments in New York (state)
Military units and formations established in 1862
Military units and formations disestablished in 1865